Natalia Wojtuściszyn (born 2 February 1993 in Gorzów Wielkopolski) is a Polish luger. She competed at the 2014 Winter Olympics in Sochi, in women's singles and team relay.

References

External links
 

1993 births
Living people
Lugers at the 2014 Winter Olympics
Lugers at the 2018 Winter Olympics
Polish female lugers
Olympic lugers of Poland
Sportspeople from Gorzów Wielkopolski